Abd ar-Rahman V was an Umayyad Caliph of Córdoba.

In the agony of the Umayyad dynasty in the Al-Andalus (Moorish Iberia), two princes of the house were proclaimed Caliph of Córdoba for a very short time, Abd-ar-Rahman IV Mortada (1017), and Abd-ar-Rahman V Mostadir (1023–1024). Both were the mere puppets of factions, who deserted them at once. Abd-ar-Rahman IV was murdered the same year he was proclaimed at Cadiz, in flight from a battle in which he had been deserted by his supporters. Abd-ar-Rahman V was proclaimed caliph in December 1023 at Córdoba, and murdered in January 1024 by a mob of unemployed workmen, headed by one of his own cousins.

References 

1001 births
1024 deaths
Umayyad caliphs of Córdoba
11th-century caliphs of Córdoba